The 1999–2000 season was the 112th season of competitive football by Celtic. Celtic competed in the Scottish Premier League, UEFA Cup, Scottish League Cup and the Scottish Cup.

Summary
The season saw Celtic finish second in the league, 21 points behind winner Rangers. They won the League Cup beating Aberdeen in the final, reached the second round of the UEFA Cup losing to Lyon and were knocked out of the Scottish Cup in the third round by Inverness Caledonian Thistle.

Managers
Celtic started the season under newly appointed John Barnes who, on 10 February, was sacked by the club. Celtic's Director of Football Kenny Dalglish took over as caretaker manager.

Results and fixtures

Friendlies

Premier League

UEFA Cup

League Cup

Scottish Cup

Squad

Statistics

League table

See also
 List of Celtic F.C. seasons

References

Celtic F.C. seasons
Celtic